Udaan is 1997 Hindi-language action film directed by Asrani and starring Rekha, Saif Ali Khan, Prem Chopra, Danny Denzongpa, Dalip Tahil, Asrani, Deven Varma, Annu Kapoor, Mohnish Bahl.

Plot
A wealthy industrialist is killed by a villainous trio. The industrialist's daughter Varsha (Rekha ) slowly starts to unravel the truth about her father's death, she is quickly disposed of to an asylum. Varsha escapes from there with the help of a man named Raja (Saif Ali Khan). Now, Varsha and Raja together start on a difficult journey to bring the villains to justice. The film also deals with subjects like adulteration, corruption and injustice in society.

Cast

Rekha as Varsha Sahay
Saif Ali Khan as Raja
Madhoo	as Madhu 
Prem Chopra as Mr. Sood
Dalip Tahil as Mr. Sethi
Mohan Joshi as Dr. Bhatia
Danny Denzongpa as Mr. Rana
Harish Patel as DSP Sahay 
Deven Verma as Madhu's Uncle "Mama"
Saeed Jaffrey as Mr. Sahay 
Mohnish Behl as Inspector Sharma
Asrani as Baba Shree, Shree 108, inmate of mental hospital
Annu Kapoor as Anand Lagpade from Mental Hospital
Narendra Gupta as inmate of mental hospital
Rana Jung Bahadur as inmate of mental hospital
Lalit Mohan Tiwari as inmate of mental hospital 
Makrand Deshpande as Masoombhai Dayachan 
Achyut Potdar as Chandra Prakash

Soundtrack

Reception
Komal Nahta of Film Information wrote that "Udaan is devoid of an exciting drama and heroism", but noted Rekha's performance.

References

External links 
 

1997 films
1990s Hindi-language films
Films scored by Anand–Milind